Matteo Lucenti (born 4 August 1992) is an Italian professional footballer who plays as a centre back for  club U.S. Pergolettese 1932.

Club career
Born in Cremona, Lucenti started his career in Cremonese youth system, and made his first team and Serie C debut on 15 May 2011 against Sorrento. After one season on Cremonese, he played seven seasons in Serie D clubs.

He joined to Pergolettese in 2018, and won the promotion to Serie C on his first year.

Honours
Pergolettese
 Serie D (Group D): 2018–19

References

External links
 
 

1992 births
Living people
Sportspeople from Cremona
Footballers from Lombardy
Italian footballers
Association football defenders
Serie C players
Serie D players
U.S. Cremonese players
A.C. Carpenedolo players
U.S. Darfo Boario S.S.D. players
A.C. Ponte San Pietro Isola S.S.D. players
U.S. Pergolettese 1932 players